In enzymology, a 4-carboxymethyl-4-methylbutenolide mutase is an enzyme that catalyzes the chemical reaction

4-carboxymethyl-4-methylbut-2-en-1,4-olide  4-carboxymethyl-3-methylbut-2-en-1,4-olide

Hence, this enzyme has one substrate, 4-carboxymethyl-4-methylbut-2-en-1,4-olide, and one product, 4-carboxymethyl-3-methylbut-2-en-1,4-olide.

This enzyme belongs to the family of isomerases, specifically those intramolecular transferases transferring other groups.  The systematic name of this enzyme class is 4-carboxymethyl-4-methylbut-2-en-1,4-olide methylmutase. Other names in common use include 4-methyl-2-enelactone isomerase, 4-methylmuconolactone methylisomerase, and 4-methyl-3-enelactone methyl isomerase.

References

 

EC 5.4.99
Enzymes of unknown structure